Frederiksberg Idrætspark, also known as Frederiksberg Stadion, is a multi-purpose stadium in Frederiksberg, Capital Region of Denmark, Denmark. It is home to FA 2000, who currently compete in the Danish 2nd Division. It is also home to Kjøbenhavns Boldklub (KB), a parent club to FC Copenhagen, and the latter also use the stadium as a training ground.

History 
The groundbreaking of Frederiksberg Idrætspark occurred in 1919, but only in 1924 did the stadium host events. The venue was officially inaugurated on 21 June 1927, and had already the previous years been utilised as a ground for football by clubs such as Brønshøj Boldklub. 

During the glory days of Kjøbenhavns Boldklub (KB) in the 1970s and 1980s, Frederiksberg Idrætspark hosted European matches, which saw clubs such as Dinamo Tbilisi, Dundee United and Fortuna Sittard guest the stadium in the 1977–78 UEFA Cup and 1984–85 European Cup Winners' Cup, respectively. Finn Laudrup, father of Brian Laudrup and Michael Laudrup, scored in the match against Dinamo Tbilisi on Frederiksberg Idrætspark.

In June 2013, the Frederikberg municipal council decided to install artificial turf and lighting for a total amount of DKK 7.5 million at Frederiksberg Idrætspark, which would allow the stadium to be used more during the winter.

References

Sports venues in Copenhagen
F.C. Copenhagen
Football venues in Denmark
Sport in Copenhagen
Sports venues completed in 1924
1924 establishments in Denmark
Buildings and structures in Frederiksberg Municipality